Gloria Balamus is a Papua New Guinean footballer who plays as a midfielder for Wewak FC and the Papua New Guinea women's national team.

References

Living people
Women's association football midfielders
Papua New Guinean women's footballers
Papua New Guinea women's international footballers
Year of birth missing (living people)